The Curphey Peaks are two snow-covered peaks of approximately similar height (the western peak being  high), the two peaks bounding the east side of Helix Pass in the Bowers Mountains, a major mountain range within Victoria Land, Antarctica. They were named by the New Zealand Antarctic Place-Names Committee in 1983 after Ian Curphey, the field leader of M.G. Laird's New Zealand Antarctic Research Program geological party to the area, 1974–75. The peaks lie situated on the Pennell Coast, a portion of Antarctica lying between Cape Williams and Cape Adare.

References
 

Mountains of Victoria Land
Pennell Coast